Norasing Lukbanyai (born August 3, 1986), also known as Jirawat Noomak, is a Thai Muay Thai fighter and boxer.

Biography and career

Norasing started Muay Thai at the age of 7.

In 2006 Norasing went undefeated, scoring multiple knockouts and winning the Lumpinee Stadium Light Flyweight title. He was elected Fighter of the Year by major institutions. In June 2009 Norasing regained the Lumpinee Stadium Flyweight title by knocking out Phetmorakot Teeded99 in the first round. The same month he beat the AJKF champion Nobuchika Terado by technical knockout in the second round.

In 2011 Norasing made the transition to western boxing and won multiple regional titles in the following years. Due to a lack of opportunities at the world level in boxing Norasing attempted a Muay Thai comeback in 2017. He then focused on being a trainer at first at Evolve MMA in Singapore and in 2020 he settled in Nagoya, Japan where he started competing in kickboxing rules. He fought Genji Umeno at RISE Eldorado 2021. He lost the fight by unanimous decision.

Titles and accomplishments

Muay Thai
Lumpinee Stadium
 2006 Lumpinee Stadium Light Flyweight (108 lbs) Champion
 2006 Lumpinee Stadium Fighter of the Year
 2007 Lumpinee Stadium Flyweight (112 lbs) Champion
 2009 Lumpinee Stadium Flyweight (112 lbs) Champion
OneSongchai
 S-1 Light Flyweight (108 lbs) Champion
Professional Boxing Association of Thailand (PAT) 
 2x Thailand Flyweight (112 lbs) Champion (2007, 2009)
Muaylok
 2010 Yodmuay Champions Cup 51 kg Champion

Awards
 2006 Sports Authority of Thailand Fighter of the Year
 2006 Siam Kela Fighter of the Year

Boxing
Pan Asian Boxing Association
 2012 PABA Super Flyweight Champion (three defenses)
Asian Boxing Council
 2014 ABCO Silver Super Flyweight Champion (defended once)

Fight record

|- style="background:#fbb;"
| 2022-05-07 || Loss|| align="left" | Ryota Naito || HEAT 50 || Nagoya, Japan|| Decision (Unanimous)|| 3|| 3:00
|- style="background:#cfc;"
| 2021-10-17 ||Win|| align="left" | Kazuhito || HEAT 49 ||Nagoya, Japan|| KO ||2 ||2:17

|-  style="background:#fbb;"
| 2021-05-23 || Loss || align=left| Kazuma || RISE 149 || Tokyo, Japan || KO (Front Kick) || 1 ||0:47

|-  style="background:#fbb;"
| 2021-02-28 || Loss || align=left| Genji Umeno || RISE Eldorado 2021 || Yokohama, Japan || Decision (Unanimous) || 3 ||3:00

|-  style="background:#fbb;"
| 2017-06-09 || Loss ||align=left| Yodmondam FighterMuaythai || True4U, Rangsit Stadium || Rangsit, Thailand || TKO (Doctor Stoppage)|| 3 ||

|-  style="background:#fbb;"
| 2014-06-10 || Loss ||align=left| Saksit Lukjaomaesaitong || Lumpinee Stadium || Bangkok, Thailand || Decision || 5 ||3:00

|-  style="background:#cfc;"
| 2010-11-14|| Win ||align=left| Nattaphon Nacheukvittayakom ||  || Nakhon Ratchasima, Thailand || KO || 1 ||

|-  style="background:#fbb;"
| 2010-09-29 || Loss ||align=left| Nopachai Kiatpattharaphan || Rajadamnern Stadium || Bangkok, Thailand || Decision || 5 ||3:00

|-  style="background:#cfc;"
| 2010-08-01|| Win ||align=left| Chanchai Sor.Thanayong ||MUAY 2010 ～Muaylokー Grand Stage Yodmuay Champions Cup, Final|| Tokyo, Japan || Decision (Split) || 5 || 3:00
|-
! style=background:white colspan=9 |

|-  style="background:#fbb;"
| 2010-06-04 || Loss ||align=left| Pornsawan Lukprabat || Lumpinee Stadium || Bangkok, Thailand || Decision || 5 ||3:00 
|-
! style=background:white colspan=9 |

|-  style="background:#cfc;"
| 2010-04-25|| Win ||align=left| Yodthongthai Por.Telakun ||MUAY 2010 2nd Muaylok ー Yodmuay Champions Cup, Semi Final|| Tokyo, Japan || KO (Left Hook) || 3 || 2:43

|-  style="background:#fbb;"
| 2010-03-05 || Loss ||align=left| Palangpon Chuwattana || Lumpinee Stadium || Bangkok, Thailand || Decision || 5 ||3:00

|-  style="background:#cfc;"
| 2009-12-24 || Win ||align=left| Pornsawan Lukprabat || Rajadamnern Stadium || Bangkok, Thailand || Decision || 5 ||3:00

|-  style="background:#cfc;"
| 2009-11-18 || Win ||align=left| Thanuphet Looknongphai || Rajadamnern Stadium || Bangkok, Thailand || KO || 2 ||

|-  style="background:#fbb;"
| 2009-09-04 || Loss ||align=left| Kritthongkam Tor.Surachet || Lumpinee Stadium || Bangkok, Thailand || Decision || 5 ||3:00

|-  style="background:#fbb;"
| 2009-07-03 || Loss ||align=left| Palangpon Piriyanoppachai || Lumpinee Stadium || Bangkok, Thailand || TKO || 4 ||

|-  style="background:#cfc;"
| 2009-06-21|| Win ||align=left| Nobuchika Terado || AJKF Norainu Dengekisakusen|| Tokyo, Japan || TKO (3 Knockdowns) || 2 || 1:12

|-  style="background:#cfc;"
| 2009-06-05 || Win ||align=left| Phetmorakot Teeded99 || Lumpinee Stadium || Bangkok, Thailand || KO (Left Hook) || 1 || 
|-
! style=background:white colspan=9 |

|-  style="background:#cfc;"
| 2009-03-24 || Win ||align=left| Khunponjiew Saengsawang || Lumpinee Stadium || Bangkok, Thailand || Decision || 5 ||3:00

|-  style="background:#fbb;"
| 2009-02-13 || Loss ||align=left| Wanchailek Kiatphukham || Lumpinee Stadium || Bangkok, Thailand || Decision || 5 || 3:00

|-  style="background:#cfc;"
| 2008-12-02 || Win ||align=left| Somboonbaeb Sor.Phumphanumuang || Lumpinee Stadium || Bangkok, Thailand || KO || 5 ||

|-  style="background:#fbb;"
| 2008-10-24 || Loss ||align=left| Chatpichit Sor.Pornchai || Lumpinee Stadium || Bangkok, Thailand || Decision || 5 || 3:00

|-  style="background:#cfc;"
| 2008-09-19 || Win ||align=left| Apidej Sor.Sommai || Lumpinee Stadium || Bangkok, Thailand || Decision || 5 || 3:00

|-  style="background:#cfc;"
| 2008-02-08 || Win ||align=left| Somboonbaeb Sor.Phumphanumuang || Lumpinee Stadium || Bangkok, Thailand || KO || 3 ||

|-  style="background:#fbb;"
| 2007-12-07|| Loss ||align=left| Pongsiri Por.Siripong || Lumpinee Stadium 51st Anniversary || Bangkok, Thailand || Decision || 5 || 3:00
|-
! style=background:white colspan=9 |

|-  style="background:#cfc;"
| 2007-10-16 || Win ||align=left| Somboonbaeb Sor.Phumphanumuang || Lumpinee Stadium || Bangkok, Thailand || Decision || 5 || 3:00

|-  style="background:#fbb;"
| 2007-07-20 || Loss ||align=left| Komphichai Rifloniasawna || Lumpinee Stadium || Bangkok, Thailand || Decision || 5 || 3:00

|-  style="background:#fbb;"
| 2007-06-08 || Loss ||align=left| Lertphet Por Worasing || Lumpinee Stadium || Bangkok, Thailand || Decision || 5 || 3:00

|-  style="background:#fbb;"
| 2007-04-03 || Loss ||align=left| Chatchai Sor.Thanayong || Lumpinee Stadium || Bangkok, Thailand || Decision || 5 || 3:00

|-  style="background:#cfc;"
| 2007-03-02 || Win ||align=left| Somboonbaeb Sor.Phumphanumuang || Lumpinee Stadium || Bangkok, Thailand || Decision || 5 || 3:00
|-
! style=background:white colspan=9 |

|-  style="background:#fbb;"
| 2007-01-30 || Loss ||align=left| Panomroonglek Kitamuu9 ||Lumpinee Stadium || Bangkok, Thailand || Decision || 5 || 3:00

|-  style="background:#cfc;"
| 2006-12-08 || Win ||align=left| Chatchai Sor.Thanayong || Lumpinee Stadium 50th Anniversary || Bangkok, Thailand || Decision || 5 || 3:00

|-  style="background:#cfc;"
| 2006-10-27 || Win ||align=left| Nakrobdam Por.Burapha || Lumpinee Stadium|| Bangkok, Thailand || Decision || 5 || 3:00

|-  style="background:#cfc;"
| 2006-08-29 || Win ||align=left| Wanheng Menayothin || Lumpinee Stadium|| Bangkok, Thailand || Decision || 5 || 3:00

|-  style="background:#cfc;"
| 2006-07-14 || Win ||align=left| Fahmai FA.Group || Lumpinee Stadium || Bangkok, Thailand || KO || 1 ||

|-  style="background:#cfc;"
| 2006-06-02 || Win ||align=left| Hualamphong Fonjangchonburi || Lumpinee Stadium || Bangkok, Thailand || KO || 1 || 
|-
! style=background:white colspan=9 |

|-  style="background:#cfc;"
| 2006-05-08 || Win ||align=left| Palangpon Piriyanopchai || Rajadamnern Stadium || Bangkok, Thailand || KO || 1 ||

|-  style="background:#cfc;"
| 2006-03-28|| Win ||align=left| Kaimookdam Pomkwanarong || Lumpinee Stadium || Bangkok, Thailand || Decision || 5 || 3:00

|-  style="background:#cfc;"
| 2006-02-24 || Win ||align=left| Fasang Pitakchai || Lumpinee Stadium || Bangkok, Thailand || KO || 2 ||

|-  style="background:#cfc;"
| 2006-01-|| Win ||align=left| Yodkeng Jockygym || Lumpinee Stadium || Bangkok, Thailand || KO ||  ||

|- style="background:#cfc;"
|2005-12-22
|Win
| align="left" | Luknimit Singklongsi
|Rajadamnern Stadium
|Bangkok, Thailand
|Decision
|5
|3:00

|- style="background:#fbb;"
|2005-10-21
|Loss
| align="left" | Lertphet Sor Tawanrung
|Rajadamnern Stadium
|Bangkok, Thailand
|Decision
|5
|3:00

|- style="background:#cfc;"
|2005-08-29
|Win
| align="left" | Linglom Tor.Chalermchai
|Rajadamnern Stadium
|Bangkok, Thailand
|Decision
|5
|3:00

|- style="background:#cfc;"
|2005-07-28
|Win
| align="left" | Chalermphon Petchsupan
|Lumpinee Stadium
|Bangkok, Thailand
|Decision
|5
|3:00

|- style="background:#fbb;"
|2005-06-24
|Loss
| align="left" | Luknimit Singklongsi
|Lumpinee Stadium
|Bangkok, Thailand
|Decision
|5
|3:00

|- style="background:#fbb;"
|2005-04-19
|Loss
| align="left" | Inseekaw Rachanon
|Lumpinee Stadium
|Bangkok, Thailand
|Decision
|5
|3:00

|- style="background:#cfc;"
|2005-02-11
|Win
| align="left" | Nuengthep Eminentair
|Lumpinee Stadium
|Bangkok, Thailand
|Decision
|5
|3:00

|- style="background:#fbb;"
|2004-11-26
|Loss
| align="left" | Pornmongkol Sakhiranchai
|Lumpinee Stadium
|Bangkok, Thailand
|Decision
|5
|3:00

|- style="background:#fbb;"
|2004-09-27
|Loss
| align="left" | Taplang Toyotarayong
|Rajadamnern Stadium
|Bangkok, Thailand
|Decision
|5
|3:00

|- style="background:#fbb;"
|2004-08-10
|Loss
| align="left" | Mahachoke Kiatphatphan
|Lumpinee Stadium
|Bangkok, Thailand
|Decision
|5
|3:00

|- style="background:#fbb;"
|2004-06-04
|Loss
| align="left" | Boonmee Sor Daranee
|Lumpinee Stadium
|Bangkok, Thailand
|Decision
|5
|3:00

|-
| colspan=9 | Legend:

References

External links
 

1986 births
Living people
Norasing Lukbanyai
Norasing Lukbanyai
Norasing Lukbanyai